The 82nd Pennsylvania House of Representatives District is located in central Pennsylvania and has been represented by Paul Takac since 2023.

District profile
The 82nd District is located in  Centre County and includes the following areas: 

Benner Township
Boggs Township
Burnside Township
College Township
Curtin Township
Harris Township
Howard
Howard Township
Liberty Township
Marion Township
Milesburg
Snow Shoe
Snow Shoe Township
State College (part)
District East 
District East Central (part) 
Division 03 
District North 
District Northeast 
District Penn State Univ. (hub) 
District South (part)
Division 02
District South Central 
District Southeast
Union Township
Unionville

Representatives

References

Government of Franklin County, Pennsylvania
Government of Juniata County, Pennsylvania
Government of Mifflin County, Pennsylvania
82